Bellbridge is a small town in the state of Victoria. Overlooking the Lake Hume and located near the Bethanga Bridge, Bellbridge is a popular destination for local tourists, especially from the nearby towns of Albury and Wodonga who often come to the Weir to water ski. The local Hume Boat Club holds an annual get-together for water skiers from across Victoria.

The township itself developed from farming land in the 1960s.

At the 2021 census, Bellbridge had a population of 393.

References

 https://web.archive.org/web/20130420101642/http://www.filmnortheastvictoria.com.au/region/index.php?town=bellbridge

Towns in Victoria (Australia)
Shire of Towong